Tamacha ( Smack; Hindi: तमाचा) is a 1988 Hindi-language action film, produced by Prasan Kapoor under the Tirupati Pictures Enterprises banner and directed by Ramesh Ahuja. It stars Jeetendra, Rajinikanth, Amrita Singh, Bhanupriya in the pivotal roles and music was composed by Bappi Lahiri. Rajnikanth did an anti-hero role of an underworld don in this movie. The film was dubbed in Tamil as Ezhai Thozhan and also dubbed in Telugu as Praja Nayakudu.

Plot
Raju and Vicky are childhood friends. Both attend the same school, spend time together, participate and excel in the same sports, and are also good in their studies. When the two months summer vacation begins, it results in tragedy for both of them, as Raju's dad loses his eyesight, and Vicky's mom passes away after giving birth to baby boy, and his dad is on the run from the police for murder. Years later, Raju is now known as Inspector Rajiv, and Vicky is a notorious gangster called Vikram Pratap Singh, both are on the opposite sides of the law, and both have sworn to kill each other.

Cast

Jeetendra as CBI Inspector Rajeev Singh "Raju"
Rajinikanth as Vikram Pratap Singh "Vicky"
Amrita Singh as Maria
Bhanupriya as Seema
Kimi Katkar as Dolly
Sumeet Saigal as Gautam
Anupam Kher as Dr. Mehta
Asrani as Constable 
Iftekhar as Senior Police Officer
Satyendra Kapoor as D.P. Saxena / Johny (Double Role)
Shreeram Lagoo as Chandra Pratap Singh 
Rohini Hattangadi as Laxmi Singh 
Nilu Phule as Jwala Pratap Singh  
Sulabha Deshpande as Shanti Singh
Murad as Rai Bahadur Pratap Singh
Sudhir Dalvi as Mohan  
Vikas Anand as Vikas
Aruna Irani
Beena Banerjee as Mohan's Wife

Soundtrack
Lyrics: Anand Bakshi

References

1988 films
1980s Hindi-language films
Films scored by Bappi Lahiri
Indian action films
1988 action films
Hindi-language action films